Tarvos Trigaranus or Taruos Trigaranos is a divine figure who appears on a relief panel of the Pillar of the Boatmen as a bull with three cranes perched on his back. He stands under a tree, and on an adjacent panel, the god Esus is chopping down a tree, possibly a willow, with an axe.

In the Gaulish language, taruos means "bull," found in Old Irish as tarb (/tarβ/), in Modern Irish/Gaelic as tarbh and in Welsh as tarw (compare "bull" in other Indo-European languages such as Latin taurus from Greek "ταύρος" or Lithuanian taŭras). Garanus is the crane (garan in Welsh, Old Cornish and Breton; see also geranos, the ritual "crane dance" of ancient Greece). Treis, or tri- in compound words, is the number three (cf. Irish trí, Welsh tri).

A pillar from Trier shows a man with an axe cutting down a tree in which sit three birds and a bull's head. The juxtaposition of images has been compared to the Tarvos Trigaranus and Esus panels on the Boatmen monument. It is possible that statues of a bull with three horns, such as the one from Autun (Burgundy, France, anciently Augustodunum) are related to this deity.

The Saturnian moon Tarvos is named after Tarvos Trigaranus, following a convention of naming members of its moon group after Gallic mythological figures.

See also
 Celtic mythology
 Triple deities
 Twrch Trwyth

Notes

References
 Delmare, Xavier (2003) Dictionnaire de la langue gauloise (2nd ed.) Paris: Editions Errance. 
 Green, Miranda J. (1992) Dictionary of Celtic Myth and Legend. London: Thames & Hudson. 
 MacCulloch, John A. (1996) Celtic Mythology. Chicago: Academy Chicago Publications.

External links

The three-horned bull
Discussion of Tarvos Trigaranus and Esus, with photos
Dutch language site telling the story about the battle between Esus and Tarvos Trigaranus

Gaulish gods
Animal gods